Kirsty Gilmour (born 21 September 1993) is a Scottish badminton player who has represented both Scotland and Great Britain.

Career 
Gilmour won the silver medal at the 2014 Commonwealth Games, losing out to Michelle Li of Canada in the final and becoming the first Scottish player to reach the women's singles finals at the Commonwealth Games. She jointly won Scottish Young Sports Personality of the Year 2012 with swimmer Craig Benson.

On 1 May 2016, Gilmour went down fighting to Carolina Marín, in the finals of the European Championship held in La Roche-sur-Yon, settling for the silver medal.

Making a second appearance at the Olympics in Rio de Janeiro, Brazil, Gilmour, the eleventh seed, won her opening match against the unseeded Sabrina Jaquet in straight games.  However, she lost her second match against the world No. 28 Linda Zetchiri 21–12, 17–21, 16–21, thereby making an exit at the group stage.

In 2017, she made it back into the final round of the European Championship in Kolding, Denmark but her pace was stopped by defending champion Carolina Marín with score 14–21, 12–21. Gilmour earned a silver medal.

As of 2022, Gilmour is the highest-ranking active badminton player representing Scotland.

Achievements

Commonwealth Games 
Women's singles

European Games 
Women's singles

European Championships 
Women's singles

BWF World Tour (2 titles, 2 runners-up) 
The BWF World Tour, which was announced on 19 March 2017 and implemented in 2018, is a series of elite badminton tournaments sanctioned by the Badminton World Federation (BWF). The BWF World Tour is divided into levels of World Tour Finals, Super 1000, Super 750, Super 500, Super 300 (part of the HSBC World Tour), and the BWF Tour Super 100.

Women's singles

BWF Grand Prix (2 titles, 6 runners-up) 
The BWF Grand Prix had two levels, the Grand Prix and Grand Prix Gold. It was a series of badminton tournaments sanctioned by the Badminton World Federation (BWF) and played between 2007 and 2017.

Women's singles

  BWF Grand Prix Gold tournament
  BWF Grand Prix tournament

BWF International Challenge/Series (10 titles, 6 runners-up) 
Women's singles

Women's doubles

  BWF International Challenge tournament
  BWF International Series tournament
  BWF Future Series tournament

Record against selected opponents 
Record against Year-end Finals finalists, World Championships semifinalists, and Olympic quarterfinalists. Accurate as of 28 November 2022.

Personal life 
Gilmour is currently based in Glasgow. Kirsty Gilmour studied at University of the West of Scotland's Ayr Campus graduating with a BA in Creative Industries Practice in 2015.

Gilmour is openly lesbian and uses she/her and they/them pronouns. She is currently the only openly LGBT badminton player to be ranked in the top 100 of any event and is one of very few openly LGBT professional badminton players.

See also 
 Scottish National Badminton Championships

References 

1993 births
Living people
Sportspeople from Bellshill
Scottish female badminton players
Badminton players at the 2016 Summer Olympics
Badminton players at the 2020 Summer Olympics
Olympic badminton players of Great Britain
Badminton players at the 2010 Commonwealth Games
Badminton players at the 2014 Commonwealth Games
Badminton players at the 2018 Commonwealth Games
Badminton players at the 2022 Commonwealth Games
Commonwealth Games silver medallists for Scotland
Commonwealth Games bronze medallists for Scotland
Commonwealth Games medallists in badminton
Badminton players at the 2019 European Games
European Games silver medalists for Great Britain
European Games medalists in badminton
Alumni of the University of the West of Scotland
LGBT badminton players
Medallists at the 2014 Commonwealth Games
Medallists at the 2018 Commonwealth Games